Knipowitschia cameliae, the Danube delta dwarf goby, is a species of goby known only from the brackish and fresh waters of a lagoon south of the Danube Delta in Romania. This species can reach a length of  SL. This species has been assessed by the IUCN as Critically Endangered, possibly extinct, it was last recorded in 1994 and surveys in that year and 1998 have failed to record the species. The specific name honours Camelia Iliana Nalbant, the wife of the senior author.

References

Danube delta dwarf goby
Fish of the Black Sea
Fish of Europe
Endemic fauna of Romania
Fish described in 1995
Taxa named by Teodor T. Nalbant